Blaž Kavčič (born 5 March 1987) is a Slovenian former professional tennis player. 
He was the highest ranked Slovenian male player ever, achieving a career-high of World No. 68 in August 2012, until Aljaž Bedene began to play for Slovenia again in January 2018, overtaking him with a career high ranking of 49. He became the first Slovenian ATP singles player to: achieve a Top 100 ranking, win a Grand Slam main draw match and perform at the Summer Olympics. He became the second Slovene ATP player earning over 2 million US dollars in prize money and is the second highest ever paid male Slovene player in history after Aljaž Bedene.

Tennis career

2005-2006: Turned Pro, Davis Cup debut
Kavčič turned professional in 2005 playing exclusively on the ATP Futures and ATP Challenger Series circuit for three seasons. 

In 2006, Kavčič made his Davis Cup debut for Slovenia.

2008-2009
In 2008 he qualified for ATP events – in Zagreb, where he lost to Roko Karanušić. In Pörtschach he defeated Teymuraz Gabashvili in the first round before losing to Igor Kunitsyn. He finished the year ranked No. 260.

In 2009 he didn't play in any of ATP Tour main draws. He played in qualifications of three Grand Slams, but lost all of them. He also played in Davis Cup.

2010
In 2010 he reached the second round in Houston on clay, but lost to big serving Sam Querrey.

Kavčič played in the 2010 French Open where he won his first grand slam match by defeating Eduardo Schwank. He became the first Slovenian male player to directly qualify for a Grand Slam tournament without having to go through qualifying rounds.

Together with Slovenia Davis Cup Team he won the 2010 Davis Cup Europe/Africa Zone Group II, ensuring Slovenia to advance to Europe/Africa Zone Group I.

2011
In 2011 at Chennai Open he reached his first career quarterfinal on the ATP Tour. He lost there against Tomáš Berdych from Czech Republic.

In the 2011 Australian Open he reached the second round for the first time in his career. He was the first Slovenian ATP player in 2R of Australia.

As a first Slovenian player on ATP Masters 1000 series he performed at 2011 Sony Ericsson Open in Miami and lost in three sets in the first round against Olivier Rochus.

At Serbia Open he lost his second quarterfinal match in straight sets against Novak Djokovic.

At 2011 Swedish Open he lost his third quarterfinal match against Tomáš Berdych.

In the 2011 US Open he played his first tournament where he lost in 1R. He also played his first Grand Slam Men's Doubles and lost in first round.

2012
In the 2012 Australian Open he lost in the second round against Juan Martín del Potro.

In the 2012 French Open he lost in straight sets in the second round against Novak Djokovic.

At 2012 Summer Olympics he reached second round where he lost against David Ferrer. He is the first Slovenian who competed at Men's Singles Tennis competition at Olympic Games.

2013
At the 2013 Australian Open, Kavcic made it to the third round of a grand slam for the first time in his career, defeating the 29th seed Thomaz Bellucci and local wildcard James Duckworth, before losing to 7th seed Jo-Wilfried Tsonga in straight sets.

In the 2013 French Open he lost in five sets in the second round against Andreas Seppi.

2021
At the 2021 Zadar Open he won his third Challenger doubles title partnering his good friend Blaž Rola.

At the 2021 Split Open he lost to Rola in his 31st Challenger singles final.

2022: Retirement
He officially announced his retirement in April at the end of the season in September after the Davis Cup.

ATP Challenger and ITF Futures finals

Singles: 36 (19–17)

Doubles: 15 (5–9)

Singles performance timeline

Davis Cup

Singles performances (17–9)

Doubles performances (5–4)

References

External links

 Official website
 
 
 

1987 births
Living people
Slovenian male tennis players
Sportspeople from Ljubljana
Tennis players at the 2012 Summer Olympics
Olympic tennis players of Slovenia